The 2021 season is Young Lion's 18th consecutive season in the top flight of Singapore football and in the S.League.

Squad

Singapore Premier League

U19 Squad
(Singapore Sport School)

Coaching staff

Transfer

In 
Pre-Season

Mid-Season

Out

Pre-Season

Loan In 
Pre-Season

Mid-Season

Loan Out

Pre-Season

Jacob Mahler subsequently return to the club during the mid-season after his BMT.

Mid-Season

Sahffee Jubpre was enlisted during the mid-season.

Loan Return
Pre-Season

Note 1: Danish Irfan loan from Geylang International is extended for one more season.

Note 2: Putra Anugerah and Bill Mamadou loan from Lion City Sailors is extended for one more season.

Note 3: Sahffee Jubpre and Harhys Stewart loan from Geylang International is extended for one more season.

Note 4: Hami Syahin loan from Police SA is extended for one more season.

Note 5: Nurshafiq Zaini loan from Tampines Rovers is extended for one more season.

Mid-Season

Nurshafiq Zaini returned and retired with immediate effect.

Retained

Friendly

Pre-Season Friendly

In-season friendlies

Team statistics

Appearances and goals 

Numbers in parentheses denote appearances as substitute.

Competitions

Overview

Singapore Premier League

See also 
 2017 Garena Young Lions FC season
 2018 Young Lions FC season
 2019 Young Lions FC season
 2020 Young Lions FC season

Notes

References 

Young Lions FC
Young Lions FC seasons